Thomas Pellatt Barber (January 31, 1863, Colchester, England – December 27, 1932, Glendale, California) was an architect active in the Southwestern United States.  Several of his works are listed on the U.S. National Register of Historic Places.

Life
Barber's family moved to the United States from England while he was still an infant. They first settled in Illinois and then moved to Colorado Springs, where he received his education.  By the late 1880s, he had partnered with L. A. Pease, to form the architectural firm of Pease and Barber, which specialized in ecclesiastical buildings.

By 1900, Barber was working alone but formed a partnership in 1902 with his brother, William, which lasted until 1920. He moved to Los Angeles, California, in 1927.

Barber died at his home in Glendale, California, on December 27, 1932.

Works
Thomas Barber designed a number of buildings that are listed on the National Register of Historic Places:
1897:  DeGraff Building, 116–118 N. Tejon, Colorado Springs, Colorado (Barber & Hastings)
1902:  St. Mary's Cathedral, 26 West Kiowa Street, Colorado Springs, Colorado (Barber, Pease, and Murdoch)
1904:  Colorado Springs City Hall, 107 N. Nevada Ave., Colorado Springs, Colorado (Barber & MacLaren)
1911:  First Methodist Episcopal Church, 216 Broom Street, Trinidad, Colorado
1916:  Clubhouse-Student Union, between 18th & 19th Sts., & 8th & 10th Aves., Greeley, Colorado (Barber & Ireland)
1920:  Methodist Episcopal Church of Montrose, 19 South Park Avenue, Montrose, Colorado
1927:  Ida M. Rice House, 1196 N. Cascade Ave., Colorado Springs, Colorado
1930:  Hollywood United Methodist Church, 6817 Franklin Avenue, Los Angeles, California
1932:  McCarty Memorial Christian Church, reinforced concrete, 1920s, Gothic, 4101 W. Adams Blvd., Los Angeles, California (Barber & Kingsbury)

Other notable works include:
1911:  First United Methodist Church, 300 E. Main, Missoula MT
1923:  Argo Hall at the Colorado School for the Deaf and Blind
1928:  First United Methodist Church, 1338 Santa Clara Street, Ventura, CA

References

External links
  

1862 births
1932 deaths
English emigrants to the United States
Artists from Colorado Springs, Colorado
American ecclesiastical architects
Architects from Colorado
People from Colchester
19th-century American architects
20th-century American architects